Hideki Matsushige is a Japanese musician, guitarist, composer, and producer, known for being the co-founder, lead guitarist for the Japanese rock band Kazha. He has been working with Japanese singer-songwriter Kazuha Oda for over a decade. They released their first album Overture in 2010. He has released 2 EPs, 3 albums, and 1 single with Kazha. He has appeared and performed at numerous anime and comic conventions with Kazha as guests of honor.

Guitars 
Hideki has been an endorser of ESP Guitars since 2018, and playing his Artist Model Guitar.

Discography

Kazha 
Kazha (2018)
Evolution (2013)
"I Still Remember" -Single version- (2010)
Overture (2010)
Breathe Through Your Dreams (2009)

References

External links
Kazha official site

Japanese guitarists
Living people
Year of birth missing (living people)